Nožed is a small settlement in the Municipality of Izola in the Littoral region of Slovenia.

References

External links
Nožed on Geopedia

Populated places in the Municipality of Izola